The 1977 Appalachian State Mountaineers football team was an American football team that represented Appalachian State University as a member of the Southern Conference (SoCon) during the 1977 NCAA Division I football season. In their seventh year under head coach Jim Brakefield, the Mountaineers compiled an overall record of 2–9 with a mark of 1–4 in conference play, and finished sixth in the SoCon.

Schedule

References

Appalachian State
Appalachian State Mountaineers football seasons
Appalachian State Mountaineers football